Mitrates are an extinct group of stem group echinoderms, which may be closely related to the hemichordates. Along with the cornutes, they form one half of the Stylophora.

Morphology
The organisms were a few millimetres long.  Like the echinoderms, they are covered in armour plates, each of which comprises a single crystal of calcite.  This is one of the features they share with the latter group, along with a water vascular system, only discovered in 2019. However, they do not display the familiar fivefold symmetry that more recent echinoderms possess, instead being close to (but not fully) bilaterally symmetrical.

Their heads had two sides; one, flat, was covered with large "pavement-like" plates, the other, convex, bore smaller plates. 
Their tails were long and segmented, resembling the stalk of a crinoid or the arm of a brittlestar.  At the opposite end was a hole which may have been mouth or anus - or both.

They also bear features reminiscent of pharyngeal slits, a character lost in other echinoderms but present in hemichordates, causing R.P.S. Jefferies to hold them as the ancestor of all chordates.

Behaviour

Mitrates have been found with associated trace fossils. Their interpretation requires an understanding of how the animal was oriented in life; it's not agreed whether the convex side of the head was up or down, or indeed whether the "tail" was at the front or back of the organism.  The trace fossils suggest that they pulled themselves through the mud with their "tail", and were flat-side up.

Notes
Rhenocystis latipedunculata

References

Homalozoa